Thoracic insufficiency syndrome is the inability of the thorax to support normal respiration.  It is frequently associated with chest and/or spinal abnormalities.  Treatment options are limited, but include supportive pulmonary care and surgical options (thoracoplasty and/or implantation of vertical expandable prosthetic titanium rib (VEPTR) devices).

References

Respiratory diseases
Syndromes